Sethu Vinayagam was an Indian stage and film actor who worked in Tamil films. He is the member of Visu's drama troupe and mostly seen in all Visu's movies. He has acted more over 100 films and plays and has made his mark as a villain, supporting roles in many films. His notable movies such as Thillu Mullu, Puthiya Theerpu, Oor Kavalan, Sathya, Mangai Oru Gangai, Penmani Aval Kanmani, Palaivana Paravaigal, Magalir Mattum, Baashha.

Film career 
He has played one of Rajinikanth's friends in a small scene in the movie Thillumullu. He also played a small villain role in the movie "Baashha".

Family 
Sethu Vinayagam has a wife and 3 daughters.

Death 
Sethu Vinayagam died on 20 September 2009 at the age of 60 due to prolonged sickness.

Filmography 
This is a partial filmography. You can expand it.

1980s

1990s

2000s

References

External links 
 https://www.imdb.com/name/nm1302977/

1949 births
2009 deaths